New Brunswick is a province of Canada.

New Brunswick may also refer to:
New Brunswick, New Jersey
New Brunswick station, New Jersey railroad station
New Brunswick, Indiana, unincorporated town
 45557 New Brunswick, a British LMS Jubilee Class locomotive

See also
New Brunswick Southwest, federal electoral district in New Brunswick, Canada
New Brunswick Railway, Canadian railway and land holding company